Federales (singular Federale or, rarely but aligning with Spanish, Federal) is a Spanglish word used in an informal context to denote security forces operating under a federal political system. The term gained widespread usage by English speakers due to popularization in such films as The Wild Bunch, The Treasure of the Sierra Madre, and Blue Streak, and the television drama series Breaking Bad and its spinoff prequel Better Call Saul. The term is a cognate and counterpart to the slang "Feds" in the United States.

Law enforcement

The term is traditionally used for certain Mexican federal police agencies such as:
 
The Mexican Federal Police, and any of its predecessors 
 Federal Preventive Police/Policía Federal Preventiva, 
 Federal Highway Police/Policía Federal de Caminos, and 
 Federal Fiscal Police/Policía Fiscal Federal.

The Federal Ministerial Police/Policía Federal Ministerial (PFM) and any of its predecessors:
 Federal Investigations Agency/Agencia Federal de Investigación and the 
 Federal Judicial Police/Policía Judicial Federal.

Military

Historically, "Federales" was also the common term used for the regular Mexican Army (or Federal Army), especially during the 34-year rule of Porfirio Díaz until 1911. In part the expression served the purpose of distinguishing centrally controlled military units from provincial militias, or the rural mounted police  (rurales). Following Díaz's overthrow by rebel forces led by Francisco Madero, the Federal Army remained in existence. The Federales were eventually disbanded in July and August 1914, after Madero's successor Victoriano Huerta was in turn defeated by an alliance of revolutionary forces. The formal dissolution of the Federal Army was decreed by the Teoloyucan Treaties, signed on August 13.

References

See also
 Policia Federal

Federal law enforcement agencies of Mexico
Mexican slang
Military of Mexico